The 1943–44 season was the 37th year of football played by Dundee United, and covers the period from 1 July 1943 to 30 June 1944.

Match results
Dundee United played a total of 38 unofficial matches during the 1944–45 season.

Legend

All results are written with Dundee United's score first.
Own goals in italics

North Eastern League Series 1

North Eastern League Series 2

Supplementary Cup

Mitchell Cup

Summer Cup

See also
 1943–44 in Scottish football

References

Dundee United F.C. seasons
Dundee United